Puricelli is an Italian surname. Notable people with the surname include:

Arturo Puricelli (born 1947), Argentine lawyer
Eduard Puricelli (1826–1893), German industrialist and politician
Ettore Puricelli (1916–2001), Italian footballer
Giuseppe Puricelli (1825–1894), Italian painter
Julien Puricelli (born 1981), French rugby union player

Italian-language surnames